The Way is the ninth studio album by English punk rock band Buzzcocks, released digitally on 1 May 2014 via PledgeMusic for pledgers only. It was released by 1-2-3-4 Go! Records as a digital download on 6 October with a physical release on 18 November. It is the first Buzzcocks album with bassist Chris Remmington and drummer Danny Farrant, and the final album to feature Pete Shelley before his death in 2018.

Background 

The band wrote a message on their website:

We've teamed up with PledgeMusic to give you privileged access to pre-order the new album plus other premium items such as the new album on signed CD or vinyl, the chance to attend a VIP "meet and greet" and even a signed guitar. Each and every one of these items and experiences comes with a high quality digital download of our ninth studio album, plus bonus tracks exclusive to PledgeMusic!
The new album will be officially released to the public in the summer but by pre-ordering you'll get your copy much sooner. Throughout the pre-order period, you'll also get free access to our 'Pledgers Only' updates here on PledgeMusic where you will be able to enjoy a load of exclusive extras, videos from the studio, interviews, demos and much, much more [...] In addition to this, pledges will benefit Teenage Cancer Trust to help them continue the incredible work they do. So as you can see, there are so many great reasons to be a part of our new album from the outset. Thanks again for all your support over the years,
Pete, Steve, Danny & Chris
Buzzcocks
2014

5% of any money raised after the goal is reached will go to Teenage Cancer Trust.

Reception

Track listing

Personnel 
Adapted from the album liner notes.

Buzzcocks
 Pete Shelley – vocals, guitar
 Steve Diggle – vocals, guitar
 Chris Remmington – bass
 Danny Farrant – drums
Technical
David M. Allen – producer, engineer (New Rose Studios), mixing
Buzzcocks – producer
Nathaniel Kemp-Hall – assistant engineer (New Rose Studios)
Sveinn Jonsson – engineer (Great Eastern Studios), mixing
Mazen Murad – mastering
Leon Seesix (credited as Dotmasters) – artwork
Joe Giacomet – layout, photography
Ian Rook – live photography

References

External links 

 

2014 albums
Buzzcocks albums
Albums produced by David M. Allen